James Patrick Garvan (2 May 1843  – 20 November 1896) was an Australian politician, Colonial Treasurer of New South Wales in 1889.

Garvan was born in Cappagh, County Limerick, Ireland, son of Denis Bourke Garvan and Anne,  Culhane. Garvan founded the North Shore Steam Ferry Co. Ltd., the City Mutual Fire Insurance Co. Ltd and the City Mutual Life Assurance Society Ltd. He represented Eden in the New South Wales Legislative Assembly. He was Minister of Justice in the Jennings ministry from February 1886 to January 1887, and Colonial Treasurer in the second Dibbs ministry from January to March 1889.

His son John Garvan was the inaugural chairman of the Commonwealth Bank of Australia.

After his death, Garvan's daughter Helen Mills donated £100,000 towards the establishment of a medical research institute, which she requested be named the Garvan Institute of Medical Research in her father's honour.

References

 

1843 births
1896 deaths
Members of the New South Wales Legislative Assembly
Irish emigrants to colonial Australia
19th-century Australian politicians
Treasurers of New South Wales